Abdel Vares Sharraf (born 1934) is an Egyptian gymnast. He competed in eight events at the 1960 Summer Olympics.

References

1934 births
Living people
Egyptian male artistic gymnasts
Olympic gymnasts of Egypt
Gymnasts at the 1960 Summer Olympics
Sportspeople from Cairo